Octavian Armașu (born 29 July 1969) is a Moldovan politician. 

On 30 November 2018 he became the head of the National Bank of Moldova, succeeding Sergiu Cioclea at this post.

Professional experience 
Previously, Armașu worked since 1996 in the private economics sector, at a few companies in Moldova.
2004-2016: Financial Director CFO, Südzucker Moldova, Republic of Moldova
2001-2004: Head Controlling (planning, budgeting, financial analysis, strategic financial planning), Südzucker Moldova, Republic of Moldova
1999-2001: Controller, Südzucker International GmbH
1997-1999: Senior Consultant, Honest Business Consulting, Moldova-Dutch Joint Venture
1996-1997: Sales Manager, Glass Container Company, Republic of Moldova

Education 
2002-2006: "Chartered Financial Analyst" (CFA), has completed training programs at "CFA Institute", United States of America
1996-1997: Center for Private Business Reform-project USAID, project with teaching in finance, accounting and marketing
1991-1994: Technical University of Moldova, specialization IT and engineering systems, Chișinău, Republic of Moldova

Marital status  
Octavian Armașu is married and has two children.

Controversies
On 30 September 2016, a Moldovan civic activist, Andrei Donică, spilled a bucket of milk over Octavian Armașu, reproaching him the attitude of the Moldovan government regarding the 2014 Moldovan bank fraud scandal.

References

External links 
 CV on gov.md

1969 births
Living people
Moldovan Ministers of Finance
Governors of National Bank of Moldova
21st-century Moldovan politicians
CFA charterholders